Kho'ini (alternatives: Xoini, Xo'ini, Khoeini, or Di) is a Tatic dialect or language spoken in northwestern Iran, and is one of many Western Iranian languages. The Xoini verbal system follows the general pattern found in other Tati dialects. However, the dialect has its own special characteristics such as continuous present which is formed by the past stem, a preverb shift, and the use of connective sounds. The dialect is in danger of extinction.

Kho'in 

Kho'in, also spelled as Xo'in an Khoein, is located in "Ejarud" rural district of Zanjan Province at the end of a long valley. In recent decades the village has lost its centrality because of veering the road of Zanjan to Bijar from Xoin. In 1960, the farmers was growing fruits around on the slopes of the hills, but Xoin's Qanats were neglected; many of the houses deteriorated already and a number of inhabitants had been migrating to Tehran seeking works. The population was 800 to 900 at the time and declining.

There has been a sense of nostalgia about the better days of Xo'in among the dwellers. Local beliefs hold that in the Qajar period some Xoinis emigrated to Merv, Ashgabat and Baku. There is a cavernous dent called "Dei-manda", meaning, "remnant of a fort" (known in other parts of Iran as "Qaleh Gabri/Gowri"), said to have been made by Zoroastrians. Some villagers legendarily believed that Xoinis had earlier been Gowr. They gave credence to being originally from Sistan. Some said when Bahman invaded Sistan to avenge his father, Esfandiyar, the descendants of Rostam fled and came to Xoin. In spite of dwindling estate, the village has 8 maintained mosques and a Tekyeh.

Geography 

Azeri Turkic has mostly replaced Xoini, however in the 1960s, the extent of the dialect was as follows:

Sipkamar (Persian: "Sefidkamar"): It is a village to the west of Xoin. The dialect was best preserved there. It had some 70 households in 1963. Sefidkamar has been more flourishing than Xoin. The access road is rather doubly arduous and limits communications, which may have been instrumental in the dialect's survival.
Xoin: Azerbaijani language is the predominant language and the indigenous dialect was fading away in 1960 and might be extinct by now. In Aruz Mâla, the northern quarter of Xoin, the dialect is somewhat better known than in Aš Mâla, the southern quarter, where almost no one knows the language any longer.
Sa'idabad: In its lower quarter, they speak mostly the dialect.
Garne: A couple of kilometers from Xoin. The people speak the dialect.
Sura: A village to the east of Xoin, which had some 250 inhabitants. Some knew the dialect.
Balubin (Persian: "Balbavin"): The dialect is spoken side by side with Turkic.
Halab: The language had practically disappeared, being replaced by Azerbaijani. Just one old man could remember a few sentences in 1960.

Phonology 

Some sounds are approximate. Some of the vowels like "e, â, o, u" and "i" show variations.

The consonants are: p, b, t, d, č, j, k, g, x, xʷ, q, f, m, n, r, l, s, z, ž, š, h, v, w, y.

In Xoini, vowel harmony, gemination and lengthening more or less occurs.

Grammar

Nouns and adjectives 

Nouns have two cases: direct and oblique. Contrary to the often case in Persian, adjective is not Post-positive. The formation of different kinds of nouns and adjectives and their order are as follows:

Pronouns 

The possessive pronouns are also used with both preposition and postposition, e.g.:
a:râ buri čeman ku pül ar-gi (tomorrow come (and) take money from me). čeman ku means "from me"
de man panir a-čman xarat-(e)š-e (he sold two maunds of cheese to me). a-čman means "to me"

They are acted as possessive adjectives too:
čeman da:s-em begi (take my hand). Note that the pronoun is repeated by the clitic -em.

For example:
čia ku (from this),
čâ ku (from that).

They serve also as adjectives:
čiân/čân daste begi (take these/those ones' hands)
čie/čâ daste begi (take this/that one's hand)

Possession is also expressed by adding suffixes to nouns. These are added after inflection for number. See the "Person Suffixes" table below.

Reflexive pronoun: geg.  But it is treated as a noun in terms of declension, e.g.:
mâ a gege-mân viar seg-mân či (we piled stones in front of ourselves).

Verbs 

The verbal system follows the general pattern found in other Tati dialects. It employs:
 A present and a past stem
 Personal suffixes
 preverbs: â-, (âje-), ar-, baʋ-/ʋaʋ-, bay/ʋay-, či-, da(r)-, dari-, pa(r)-, wut-
 Negative Marker: ne-
 Prohibitive Marker: ma-
 Subjunctive/Imperative prefix: be-
 Imperfective: -in-/-en-/-m-
 Insistence, necessity, volition: pi-; e.g.: te pi niši (you must not go)
 Desire, need: pi-sta-; e.g.: pist-am/pista-r-im bešum (I want to go)

However, the main exceptional characteristics of Xoini are:
Continuous present is made by the past stem;
The preverbs shift their positions depending on tense and mood;
The use of a connective sound is frequent. It is generally -r- and sometimes -y-, when the vowels of the different elements of a verb come into contact. For example: mesar te nâza-r-â-m-bim (this year you will become well).

The above suffixes serve as:
 Possessives, e.g.: berâ-m âmi (My brother came).
 Agents of past transitive verbs in an ergative construction, e.g.: te ow-i ente (You drank water).
 Objects, direct or indirect, e.g.: ü seg-ešân p(e)tow-šân kay (They threw a stone).

The suffixes may be attached to the verb; the agent of the verb in an ergative construction; an adverb; a prepositional or postpositional phrase; and in a compound verb to its nominal Complement.

The same set of endings is used for the present and the subjunctive. The endings of the preterit and the present perfect are basically the enclitic present forms of the verb 'to be' (*ah-, here called base one). For pluperfect and subjunctive perfect the freestanding auxiliary verb 'to be' (*bav-, here called base two) is utilized. There is no ending for singular imperative and it is -ân for plural. For the inflections of "to be" see "Auxiliary inflection" below.

Conjugations

Stems and imperative mood 

The past and present stems are irregular and shaped by historical developments, e.g.: wuj- / wut- (to say); xaraš-/xarat- (to sell); taj-/tat- (to run). However, in many verbs the past stem is built on the present stem by adding -(e)st; e.g.: brem- → bremest- (to weep).

The imperative is formed by the modal prefix be- if the verb contains no preverb, plus the present stem and without ending in the singular and with -ân in the plural. be- is often changed to bi-, bo- or bu- according to the situation, and appears as b- before a vowel of a verbal stem.

Active voice

Passive and causative 

{| border="1" cellpadding="4" cellspacing="0" style="border:1px solid #aaa; border-collapse:collapse; text-align: center;"
|- bgcolor="#ADD8E6"

|-
!width="60"|Form
!width="150"|Notes
!width="300"|Example(s)
|-
|Passive || style="text-align: justify;"| The passive stem: present stem + -(e)st || šur-est-e (was washed); â-kar-est-i/karesti-â/karesti-râ (had been opened, lit.: has been opened); xuar-est-i (has been eaten)
|-
|Causative || style="text-align: justify;"| present stem + -en or -jen || bekejer! (laugh!) → 'bekejer-en! (make laugh!); betta(j)! (run!) → bettâ-jen! (make run!, gallop!)
|-
|}

 Auxiliary inflection 
The conjugation of the verb 'to be' uses two different bases; historically one from the root *ah- and the other from the root *bav-.

The present from the root *bav- is the present of "to become" which is from the same root with the addition of the preverb â- and the imperfective prefix (e)m-, thus: â-m-bum, â-m-bin, â-m-buk; â-m-biâm, â-m-biân â-m-bend (I become, you become, etc.). So it doesn't mean "to be".

There is another form, hest- which occurs in the sense of "to be, to exist": hest-im, hest-iš, hest-e; hest-im, hest-iân, hest-end.

 Particles 

Prepositions, postpositions and the conjunction "and" of Xoini are as follows:

 Turkic influence 

Xoini has been impacted by Turkic Azeri to some extent. That includes borrowing a number of verbal forms, for example: -miš which is attached to the past stem of some verbs to form a verbal noun, e.g., wut-miš (saying). The postposition, -da (from) seems to be Turkic. There exist also a number words e.g.: düz'' (straight, right).

Vocabulary and example sentences

References

Yarshater, E., 2002. The Xo'ini dialect. Persica, Vol. 18, P. 85-102. 

Northwestern Iranian languages
Languages of Iran
Endangered languages
Endangered Iranian languages
Endangered languages of Iran
Zanjan Province